Hans Humann (born 1878 in Smyrna; died 7 October 1933) was an officer in the Imperial German Navy, diplomat (Naval Attaché) and businessman. Humann became famous as one of the main representatives of the German Reich in the Ottoman Empire during the First World War, as well as the publisher of the widely circulated Deutsche Allgemeine Zeitung since 1920, when industrialist Hugo Stinnes bought the paper. Humann was a key German eyewitness of the Armenian genocide. As a personal friend and key wartime associate of Enver Pasha, he even defended the genocide in newspaper articles for DAZ during the Weimar republic.

Biography

Early Years (1878–1913)

References

1878 births
1933 deaths
German diplomats
Armenian genocide perpetrators
World War I crimes by Imperial Germany
Imperial German collusion with war crimes by the Ottoman Empire
German expatriates in the Ottoman Empire